ŠKODA AUTO University (czech: ŠKODA AUTO Vysoká škola, abbreviated ŠAVŠ) is a private university, located in Mladá Boleslav, Czech Republic. The ŠKODA AUTO University was founded in 2000. It was established by automobile manufacturer Škoda Auto and it is the only education institution in the Czech Republic that was founded by a large multinational company. It provides Bachelor and Master studies as full-time or part-time study. ŠKODA AUTO University has been involved into the European Union project Erasmus since 2005.

Location
University is located 50 kilometres from Prague, in Mladá Boleslav. It is situated in the historical centre of the town.

University today
More than one thousand students study at Škoda Auto University at the present time.

Number of students on 1. August 2019 
 full-time study (900 students)
 part-time study (234 students)

Courses
The university offers three bachelor study programs and four masters programs in Czech and English.

Bachelor study programs: 
 Sales Management
 Logistics and Quality Management
 Financial Management
 Human Resources Management
 Industrial Management
 Business Informatics

Master study programs: 
 International Marketing
 International Supply Chain Management
 Finance in International Business
 Law in the Global Business Environment
 Business Informatics
 Industrial Management

Studying in Prague
Starting from the academic year 2018/2019, lectures are taking place in new premises of ŠKODA AUTO University at Ekonomická 957, Prague 4 (the building of VŠE). The university offers full-time study of all follow-on Master’s programmes and selected Bachelor’s programmes (only in Czech; programmes in English are taught in Mladá Boleslav).

Bachelor’s degree programmes:
 Human Resources Management 
 Financial Management

Follow-on Master’s degree programmes:
 Law in the Global Business Environment
 Finance in International Business
 International Marketing
 International Supply Chain Management

References

Universities in the Czech Republic
Educational institutions established in 2000
Private universities and colleges
Mladá Boleslav
Buildings and structures in Mladá Boleslav
2000 establishments in the Czech Republic
Buildings and structures in the Central Bohemian Region